Zoë van der Weel (born 14 November 1990) is a British-Norwegian retired handball player, who plays for the Norwegian club Aker Topphåndball. She played for the British national team, and competed at the 2012 Summer Olympics in London. van der Weel was born in Edinburgh to Dutch parents and moved to Trondheim in Norway at age five. She is a dual citizen of Norway and the United Kingdom. She has played for the Norwegian teams Byåsen IL and Nordstrand IF, and studied sports biology at the Norwegian School of Sport Sciences.

References

External links
 
 
 

1990 births
Living people
Sportspeople from Edinburgh
Sportspeople from Trondheim
British female handball players
Norwegian female handball players
British people of Dutch descent
Norwegian people of Dutch descent
Handball players at the 2012 Summer Olympics
Olympic handball players of Great Britain
Norwegian School of Sport Sciences alumni